cAMP-dependent protein kinase type I-beta regulatory subunit is an enzyme that in humans is encoded by the PRKAR1B gene.

Clinical significance 

Mutations in PRKAR1B cause neurodegenerative disorder.

Interactions 

PRKAR1B has been shown to interact with AKAP1 and PRKAR1A.

References

Further reading

External links 
 

Genes on human chromosome 7